The Moose River is a river in the Hudson Plains ecozone of northern Ontario, Canada. The river flows 100 km northeast from the confluence of the Mattagami and Missinaibi Rivers into James Bay. Its full length is  if counted from the head of the Mattagami River.

This river formed part of the water route to Lake Superior in the days of the fur trade. Moose Factory, located on Moose Factory Island near the river's mouth, was a fur trading post of the Hudson's Bay Company and Ontario's first English settlement. Moosonee, on the north bank of the river, is the northern terminus of the Polar Bear Express railway route which begins at Cochrane, Ontario.

Tributaries
The tributaries of this river include:
North French River
Kwetabohigan River
Chimahagan River
Abitibi River
Little Abitibi River
Frederick House River
Black River
Lake Abitibi
Cheepash River
Renison River
Mattagami River
Kapuskasing River
Nemegosenda River
Chapleau River
Groundhog River
Ivanhoe River
Nat River
Missinaibi River
Brunswick River
Fire River
Hay River
Mattawitchewan River
Albany Forks
Oba River, Oba Lake
Pivabiska River
Opasatika River
Soweska River

Moose River Bird Sanctuary
Moose River Bird Sanctuary lies at the mouth of the Moose River and comprises Ship Sands Island and a piece of land on the eastern flats of the river mouth. The  sanctuary is protected under the Migratory Birds Convention Act and is part of the Southern James Bay wetland complex, which was designated a wetland of international importance (Ramsar Convention) in May 1987.

This area plays a significant role in the annual cycle of waterfowl. The funnel-shaped outline of Hudson and James bays causes birds migrating from the Arctic to concentrate at the southern end of James Bay each autumn, particularly in the late autumn, where the extensive coastal wetlands provide critical staging and moulting areas for migrating lesser snow geese, dabbling ducks and shorebirds such as red knot, short-billed dowitcher, dunlin, greater yellowlegs, lesser yellowlegs, ruddy turnstone, and American golden plover.

Settlement of Moose River
At mile 142 of the Polar Bear Express railway route there is a small settlement called Moose River. This settlement is just before a large railway bridge that crosses Moose River and is a flag stop on the Polar Bear Express rail route. There is an Ontario Northland Railway bunkhouse that used to be a school. The Moose River bridge was built in the 1930s and the settlement was a much larger community at that time. Currently the Moose River stop at mile 142 is used for the residents of the settlement and as a pick-up and drop-off site for boaters.

See also
List of Ontario rivers

References

Rivers of Cochrane District
Bird sanctuaries of Canada
Tributaries of James Bay